The Vuelta Ciclista a Murcia  is a road bicycle race held in and around Murcia, Spain. The first four editions were reserved to amateurs. Originally the race was held in early March and consisted of five stages. However, due to Spain's financial turmoil, the race was scaled back to three stages in 2011 and two stages in 2012. From 2013 to 2018 the Vuelta a Murcia was organised as a single-day race and shifted to mid-February on the international calendar. In 2019 the race was expanded to two stages. It is part of the UCI Europe Tour as a 2.1 event. However, due to the postponement of the 2021 edition to May, the race was reverted to its one-day nature, with the expectation that the race will continue as a two-day event in future editions.

Controversies
All Italian teams were banned from taking part in the 2010 edition of the race by race organizers. This decision was made due to the banning of Spanish cyclist Alejandro Valverde by the Italian Olympic Committee due to his links with the Operación Puerto blood doping ring.

In 2011 Alberto Contador won both the overall and points classification after winning Stage 2 and the Stage 3 individual time trial. However, in February 2012 he was suspended and all his results after July 2010 were voided, awarding Jérôme Coppel of Saur Sojasun the overall victory.

Past winners – men's race

Past winners – women's race

References

External links
 

 
Murcia
Recurring sporting events established in 1981
1981 establishments in Spain
Sport in the Region of Murcia
UCI Europe Tour races